Strombolicchio is a sea stack of volcanic origin  to the northeast of the island of Stromboli in the Aeolian Islands of Italy. Its name in the Sicilian language, Struognulicchiu, means Little Stromboli.

Geology
Geologically, Strombolicchio is a volcanic plug or spine of extremely hard compacted basalt resistant to erosion, and is the remnant of the original volcano from which the island of Stromboli was built up. Eruptions at this site ceased approximately 200,000 years ago. It is the only remnant above sea level of an otherwise submarine platform that extends between it and the main island.

Flora and fauna
Strombolicchio hosts some very rare species of flora and fauna and has been declared a natural reserve, with severe restrictions on access. Bassia saxicola, for example, an endangered flower at risk of extinction, is otherwise present in only a few hundred specimens on the island of Capri. Podarcis raffonei, a rare lizard classified as at critical risk of extinction, is found at only three other locations, all of which are in the Aeolian Islands: a small islet off the coast of the nearby island of Salina, another islet off the coast of Filicudi, and in some areas of Vulcano.

Strombolicchio lighthouse
Strombolicchio Lighthouse, located on its summit, can be reached by a concrete stairway of over 200 steps.

References

Notes

Aeolian Islands
Volcanoes of Italy
Volcanic plugs of Italy
Stacks (geology)
Stromboli